Harvey Norwood Gavin Kreyl (4 April 1925 – 10 January 2012) was a New Zealand rugby league footballer who played in the 1950s. He played at representative level for New Zealand.

Playing career
Keryl played at  during the era of contested scrums. He represented Wellington and, in 1952, was selected for New Zealand, becoming the 342nd player to play for the New Zealand national rugby league team.

Kreyl toured Australia that year with the New Zealand side, but was not selected in any test matches during the tour.

Death
Kreyl died on 10 January 2012, and his ashes were buried at Taitā Lawn Cemetery.

References

1925 births
2012 deaths
New Zealand national rugby league team players
New Zealand rugby league players
Place of birth missing
Rugby league props
Wellington rugby league team players
Burials at Taitā Lawn Cemetery